Dzoragyugh is a village in the Talin Municipality of the Aragatsotn Province of Armenia.

References

Populated places in Aragatsotn Province